The Women's High Jump event at the 2005 World Championships in Athletics was held at the Helsinki Olympic Stadium on August 6 and August 8.

Medalists

Records

Results

Qualification
Qualification: 1.93 m (Q) or best 12 performances (q)

Final

References

High Jump
High jump at the World Athletics Championships
2005 in women's athletics